Lee Kang-jo (Hangul: 이강조; Hanja: 李康助; born October 27, 1954) is a South Korean football manager.

Club career statistics

Coach & manager career 
 1985–1986: Yukong Elephants Trainer
 1987–1989: Gangneung Jeil High School Manager
 1990–2002: Sangmu FC Manager
 2003–present: Gwangju Sangmu FC Manager

International goals
Results list South Korea's goal tally first.

External links

1954 births
Living people
Association football midfielders
South Korean footballers
South Korea international footballers
South Korean football managers
K League 1 players
1980 AFC Asian Cup players
1984 AFC Asian Cup players
Gimcheon Sangmu FC managers
jeju United FC managers
Korea University alumni
Asian Games gold medalists for South Korea
Medalists at the 1978 Asian Games
Asian Games medalists in football
Footballers at the 1978 Asian Games